Anchors Up also released as Anchors Up - Boats to the Rescue, is a 2017 Norwegian 3D computer-animated film directed by Simen Alsvik and William John Ashurst, from a screenplay by Karsten Fullu and Alsvik.

Voice cast

English voice cast 
Cameron Simpson as Elias
Lucy Carolan as Stella
Danna Davis as Queen of the Sea
Dermot Magennis as Vinnie, Billy Bob and Cruiser
Marcus Lamb as Grabber, Henry, Gull and Flash
Paul Tylak as Trigger, Bobby and additional voices
Roger Gregg as Big Blinky, Gerald and Goliath
Doireann Ní Chorragáin as Gill and Swifty
Aileen Mythen as Dippy, Helinor and Brenda
Jim Elliot as Trawler, Racer and Speedster
Niamh McCann as Crane, Little Jane, Marcus and Martinus
Ian Coppinger as Terry and Trolley
Ulises Olvera-Arroyo as the Spanish Cargo Ships

References

External links 

2017 films
2010s Norwegian-language films